Marcelle Engelen Faber (3 August 1923 – 7 January 2023) was a French resistant.

Biography
Engelen was born in Strasbourg on 3 August 1923 into a religious family of five children and a father who worked as a jeweler.

Initially, the group aided Alsatian prisoners of war, providing food, clothing, and mail transportation from the autumn of 1940 to February 1942.

In January 1942, Engelen appeared before the Reich Labour Service and was sent to the occupied zone. In the autumn of 1944, she interrupted her studies to serve in the women's branch of the Free French Forces.

After World War II, Engelen married geologist Jean Faber, with whom she had four children. She did not maintain good relations with the other members of the Équipe Pur Sang due to her escape from arrest. She eventually outlived every other member of the group.

Marcelle Engelen Faber died in Meylan on 7 January 2023 at the age of 99.

References

1923 births
2023 deaths
French Resistance members
People from Strasbourg